Adan Abadala Hussein (born 13 October 2002) is a Norwegian footballer who plays as a midfielder for  Bodø/Glimt.

Club career
Hussein was born in Bø. He made his senior debut for Bodø/Glimt on 22 August 2020 against Start; Bodø/Glimt won 6–0.

In October 2020, Hussein was loaned out to 1. divisjon club Stjørdals-Blink for the rest of the season.

In April 2021, Hussein was loaned out to 2. divisjon club Florø for the remainder of the season.

Career statistics

Club

References

2002 births
Living people
People from Bø, Nordland
Norwegian footballers
Eliteserien players
Association football midfielders
FK Bodø/Glimt players
IL Stjørdals-Blink players
Florø SK players
Norway youth international footballers
Sportspeople from Nordland